Bhambla is a village panchayat in the Reasi district in the union territory of Jammu and Kashmir, India. It is also part of proposed Jammu–Poonch line. It is a hilly region which falls under chambh sector. It lies close to the Pakistan border.

References

Villages in Jammu district